Rachel Mary Berkeley Portman, OBE (born 11 December 1960) is an English composer who is best known for scoring films.

Early life and education
Portman was born in Haslemere in Surrey, England, the daughter of Sheila Margaret Penelope (née Mowat) Portman and Berkeley Charles Berkeley Portman. She was educated at Charterhouse and became interested in music from a young age, beginning composing at the age of 14.

After finishing school, Portman studied Music at Worcester College, Oxford. It was here that her interest in composing music for films began as she started experimenting with writing music for student films and theatre productions.

Career
Portman's career in music began with writing music for drama in BBC and Channel 4 films such as Oranges Are Not the Only Fruit, Mike Leigh's Four Days in July and Jim Henson's Storyteller series.

Since then, Portman has written over 100 scores for film, television and theatre.

Her other works include a children's opera, The Little Prince (which was later adapted for television) and Little House on the Prairie, a musical based upon the Laura Ingalls Wilder books Little House on the Prairie (2008). Portman was commissioned to write a piece of choral music for the BBC Proms series in August 2007 called The Water Diviner's Tale.

Awards and honours
Portman's first award was received as the result of scoring "a large body of work" for The Storyteller, for which she received the Anthony Asquith Award from the British Film Institute.

Later, Portman became the first female composer to win an Academy Award in the category of Best Musical or Comedy Score (for Emma in 1996). Portman was also nominated for Academy Awards for her scores for The Cider House Rules in 1999 and Chocolat in 2000.

On 19 May 2010, she was given the Richard Kirk Award at the BMI Film & TV Awards for her contributions to film and television music. Portman is the first woman to receive the honour.

Portman was appointed Officer of the Order of the British Empire (OBE) in the 2010 New Year Honours.

In 2015, Portman received the Primetime Emmy Award for Outstanding Music Composition for a Miniseries, Movie, or a Special for her work on Bessie. 2022 she was honoured with the Career Achievement Award at the Zurich Film Festival.

Personal life 
Portman married producer Uberto Pasolini in 1995, but the couple divorced in 2006; they have three children.

Filmography

Privileged (1982)
Reflections (1984)
Last Day of Summer (1984)
Four Days in July (1985)
Sharma and Beyond (1986)
Good as Gold (1986)
A Little Princess (1986)
1914 All Out (1987)
The Short and Curlies (1987)
The Falklands War: The Untold Story (1987)
90 Degrees South (1987)
The Storyteller (1988) TV Series
Loving Hazel (1988)
Sometime in August (1988)
The Woman in Black (1989)
Young Charlie Chaplin (1989)
Monster Maker (1989)
Living with Dinosaurs (1989)
Precious Bane (1989) (TV)
Oranges Are Not the Only Fruit (1990)
Shoot to Kill (1990)
Life Is Sweet (1990)
The Storyteller: Greek Myths (1990)
The Widowmaker (1990)
Where Angels Fear to Tread (1991)
Antonia and Jane (1991)
Flea Bites (1991) (TV)
Elizabeth R: A Year in the Life of the Queen (1992) (TV)
Used People (1992)
Mr Wakefield's Crusade (1992) (TV)
Rebecca's Daughters (1992)
The Cloning of Joanna May (1992)
Friends (1993)
The Joy Luck Club (1993)
Benny & Joon (1993)
Ethan Frome (1993)
Great Moments in Aviation (1993)
The Road to Wellville (1994)
Only You (1994)
Sirens (1994)
War of the Buttons (1994)
To Wong Foo, Thanks for Everything! Julie Newmar (1995)
Palookaville (1995)
Smoke (1995)
A Pyromaniac's Love Story (1995)
Marvin's Room (1996)
Emma (1996) (Won the Academy Award for Best Musical or Comedy Score)
The Adventures of Pinocchio (1996)

Beauty and the Beast: The Enchanted Christmas (1997)
Addicted to Love (1997)
Beloved (1998)
Home Fries (1998)
The Cider House Rules (1999) (Academy Award Nomination for Best Original Score)
Ratcatcher (1999)
The Other Sister (1999)
Chocolat (2000) (Academy Award Nomination for Best Original Score)
The Legend of Bagger Vance (2000)
The Closer You Get (2000)
The Emperor's New Clothes (2001)
Nicholas Nickleby (2002)
The Truth About Charlie (2002)
Hart's War (2002)
Mona Lisa Smile (2003)
The Human Stain (2003)
The Manchurian Candidate (2004)
Lard (2004)
Oliver Twist (2005)
Define Normal (2005)
Because of Winn-Dixie (2005)
Infamous (2006)
The Lake House (2006)
H2Hope: The Water Diviner's Tale (Musical, BBC Prom 57) (2007)
The Sisterhood of the Traveling Pants 2 (2008)
The Duchess (2008)
Grey Gardens (2009)
Never Let Me Go (2010)
Snow Flower and the Secret Fan (2010)
One Day (2011)
Bel Ami (2011; shared scoring credit with Lakshman Joseph De Saram)
The Vow (2012; some of the film also scored by Michael Brook)
Private Peaceful (2012)
Still Life (2013)
Paradise (2013)
Girl Rising (documentary) (2013)
The Right Kind of Wrong (2013)
Belle (2013; wide release 2014)
Dolphin Tale 2 (2014)
Bessie (2015) (won the Emmy Award for Outstanding Music Composition for a Limited Series, Movie, or Special)
Mog's Christmas Calamity (2015)
Despite the Falling Snow (2016)
Their Finest (2016)
Race (2016)
A Dog's Purpose (2017)
Mimi and the Mountain Dragon (2019)
Godmothered (2020)

References

External links

 Rachel Portman at the Danish Filmmusic Society

1960 births
20th-century classical composers
20th-century English composers
20th-century English women musicians
20th-century women composers
21st-century classical composers
21st-century English composers
21st-century English women musicians
21st-century women composers
Alumni of Worcester College, Oxford
Animation composers
Best Original Music Score Academy Award winners
English classical composers
English film score composers
English opera composers
Women classical composers
Women film score composers
Women opera composers
Georges Delerue Award winners
Living people
Primetime Emmy Award winners
Officers of the Order of the British Empire
People educated at Charterhouse School
People from Haslemere
Varèse Sarabande Records artists